Kardam (Turkish and ) is a village in General Toshevo Municipality, Dobrich Province, in northeastern Bulgaria. Kardam is close to the border with Romania and there is a border crossing linking the village to the Romanian town Negru Vodă.

References

Villages in Dobrich Province
Bulgaria–Romania border crossings